William Browning was a Scottish amateur football outside left who played in the Scottish League for Queen's Park. He was capped by Scotland at amateur level.

References 

Association football outside forwards
Scottish footballers
Queen's Park F.C. players
Scottish Football League players
Scotland amateur international footballers
Year of birth missing
Year of death missing
Place of birth missing